Sturdee's pipistrelle (Pipistrellus sturdeei), also known as the Bonin pipistrelle bat, is a bat that was thought to have lived in Japan before officially becoming extinct in 2000. In 2020, the IUCN changed its official status to "extinct".

Pipistrellus sturdeei was thought to have existed solely on Haha-jima Island in the Bonin Islands, Japan, where the only known specimen was discovered. More recent scholarship, though, places doubt on the single specimen's origin and taxonomy. The previous population of this animal is unknown because only one specimen has been preserved, which is currently housed in the Natural History Museum, London. No record of Sturdee's pipistrelle has been observed over the last 100 years.

References

Pipistrellus
Mammals described in 1915
Taxa named by Oldfield Thomas
Bats of Asia
Endemic fauna of Japan
Mammals of Japan
Natural history of the Bonin Islands
Extinct animals of Japan
Species known from a single specimen
Mammal extinctions since 1500